Brice Craig Turang (born November 21, 1999) is an American professional baseball shortstop for the Milwaukee Brewers of Major League Baseball (MLB).

Amateur career
Turang attended Santiago High School in Corona, California. As a freshman he was named the National Freshman of the Year by MaxPreps after hitting .475 with two home runs and 27 runs batted in (RBIs). He also won the Richard W. "Dick" Case Award, by USA Baseball. As a junior in 2017, he hit .465 and struck out only once in 101 at-bats. In 2018, as a senior, he batted .352 with five home runs and 21 RBIs. Turang committed to Louisiana State University (LSU) to play college baseball.

Professional career
Turang was selected 21st overall by the Milwaukee Brewers in the 2018 Major League Baseball draft. He signed for a $3.4 million signing bonus and was assigned to the Arizona League Brewers before being promoted to the Helena Brewers in August. In 42 games between the two clubs, Turang batted .283 with one home run, 18 RBIs, and 14 stolen bases.

Turnag began 2019 with the Wisconsin Timber Rattlers, earning Midwest League All-Star honors. After slashing .287/.384/.376 with two home runs, 31 RBIs, and 21 stolen bases over 82 games with Wisconsin, he was promoted to the Carolina Mudcats in July. Over 47 games with Carolina, he batted .200 with one home run, six RBIs, and nine stolen bases.

Turang did not play a minor league game in 2020 due to the cancellation of the minor league season caused by the COVID-19 pandemic. To begin 2021, he was assigned to the Biloxi Shuckers and was promoted to the Nashville Sounds in early August. Over 117 games between the two clubs, Turang slashed .258/.347/.362 with six home runs, 53 RBIs, and twenty stolen bases.

Personal
His father, Brian Turang, played in Major League Baseball (MLB). His mother Carrie played twice in the Women's College World Series for Long Beach State. His sister Brianna is married to National Football League (NFL) punter Tress Way and played in the Women's College World Series three times for Oklahoma. His sister Carissa played soccer and softball at Oklahoma City University and softball at Cal State Fullerton. Another sister, Cabria, played soccer at Utah. His sister Bailee played volleyball at Southern Nazarene University.

References

External links

1999 births
Living people
Sportspeople from Corona, California
Baseball players from California
Baseball shortstops
Arizona League Brewers players
Helena Brewers players
Wisconsin Timber Rattlers players
Carolina Mudcats players
Biloxi Shuckers players
Nashville Sounds players